Now That's What I Call Music! 19 was released on July 19, 2005. The album is the 19th edition of the Now! series in the United States. It debuted at number one on the Billboard 200, becoming the seventh volume of the series to reach the top of the pop album chart. It is also the only Now compilation to crossover and reach number one on the Billboard Top R&B/Hip-Hop Albums chart.

Now! 19 has been certified 2× Platinum and features one Billboard Hot 100 number-one hit, "Hollaback Girl".

Track listing

Charts

Weekly charts

Year-end charts

References

2005 compilation albums
 019
Capitol Records compilation albums